Vernon Goodridge (born February 18, 1984) is an American professional basketball player.

College career
Goodridge attended Mississippi State University and La Salle University. He is from Brooklyn, New York.

Professional career 
Goodridge was the 5th overall pick in the 2010 NBA Development League Draft by the Springfield Armor. In 33 games with the Armor, Goodridge averaged 9 points and 5.4 rebounds in 23.2 minutes per game, after which he was traded to the Maine Red Claws for Eugene Spates.

In the summer of 2011, Goodridge signed with Argentinian team 9 de Julio de Río Tercero but left before making an appearance.

In September 2011, he signed a one-year deal with BC Kyiv of Ukraine. In July 2012, he signed with Khimik Yuzhny. In March 2013, he moved to Turkey and signed with Yeşilgiresun Belediye for the rest of the season.

In November 2013, he signed with Hapoel Kfar Saba of Israel. In January 2014, he moved to Spain and signed with La Bruixa d'Or Manresa for the rest of the season.

In September 2014, Goodridge signed with AEK Athens of Greece. He left AEK after only three games in the Greek League. In December 2014, he signed with UniCEUB/BRB of Brazil for the rest of the season.

On January 20, 2016, he signed with Piratas de Quebradillas of the Puerto Rican BSN.

In December 2016, he signed with Indios de Ciudad Juárez of the Liga Nacional de Baloncesto Profesional.

The Basketball Tournament
In 2017, Goodridge competed for The Washington Generals in The Basketball Tournament. The team lost in the round of 64.

References

External links
 ACB.com profile
 FIBA.com profile
 Eurobasket.com profile
 RealGM.com profile

1984 births
Living people
AEK B.C. players
American expatriate basketball people in Brazil
American expatriate basketball people in Greece
American expatriate basketball people in Israel
American expatriate basketball people in Lebanon
American expatriate basketball people in Mexico
American expatriate basketball people in Spain
American expatriate basketball people in Turkey
American expatriate basketball people in Ukraine
American expatriate basketball people in Venezuela
Basketball players from New York City
Bàsquet Manresa players
BC Khimik players
BC Kyiv players
Bucaneros de La Guaira players
Hapoel Kfar Saba B.C. players
La Salle Explorers men's basketball players
Liga ACB players
Maine Red Claws players
Mississippi State Bulldogs men's basketball players
Piratas de Quebradillas players
Power forwards (basketball)
Sportspeople from Brooklyn
Springfield Armor players
Yeşilgiresun Belediye players
American men's basketball players